The Ottawa Mosque is a mosque in Ottawa, Ontario, Canada.

History
The establishment of the mosque was announced in 1973 and established in 1977, making it the oldest mosque in Ottawa.

Architecture
The mosque was designed by architect Ghazi Anwar Asad. The mosque consists of two floors and can accommodate up to 700 worshippers. Its minaret stands at a height of 35 meters. The mosque also features a library, meeting rooms, childcare center and event halls. It also houses the headquarters of the Ottawa Muslim Association.

See also
 Islam in Canada

References

1977 establishments in Ontario
Mosques completed in 1977
Mosques in Ontario
Religious buildings and structures in Ottawa
20th-century religious buildings and structures in Canada